SmartLess is a podcast hosted by the American actors Jason Bateman, Sean Hayes and Canadian actor Will Arnett. Its first episode was released on July 20, 2020, and new episodes are released weekly each Monday. Every episode begins with one of the hosts revealing a mystery guest to the other two hosts. Once revealed, the three hosts begin interviewing the mystery guest.

In May 2021, the podcast signed with Creative Artists Agency. In June 2021, the podcast was acquired by Amazon.com, Inc. for around US$80 million. With the deal, the podcast will be made available on Amazon Music and Wondery+ one week before other podcast and streaming platforms.

In August 2021, Discovery+ ordered two documentary-style specials following the podcast's North American six-city tour, which began in February 2022, featuring behind-the-scenes footage and celebrity interviews.

Episodes

Reception 
SmartLess won "Best Comedy Podcast" at the 2022 iHeartRadio Podcast Awards.

References

External links 
 

2020 podcast debuts
Audio podcasts
Comedy and humor podcasts
Interview podcasts